The Dalmatian is a breed of dog, which has a white coat marked with black or brown-colored spots. Originating as a hunting dog, it was also used as a carriage dog in its early days. The origins of this breed can be traced back to present-day Croatia and its historical region of Dalmatia. It is thought that early ancestors of the breed were certain breeds of pointers and a spotted Great Dane. Today, it is a popular family pet and many dog enthusiasts enter Dalmatians into kennel club competitions.

Characteristics

Body 
The Dalmatian is a muscular dog with excellent endurance and stamina.

Coat 
Dalmatian puppies are born with plain white coats and their first spots usually appear within 10 days; however, spots may be visible on their skin from birth. They continue to develop until the dog is around 18 months old. Spots usually range in size from 2 to 6 cm (1.25 to 2.5 in), and are most commonly black or liver (brown) on a white background. Liver is the recessive colour in dalmatians, meaning that both parents have to carry the liver gene to produce this colour of pups. If both parents are liver, then all puppies will be liver-spotted. A dog who is dominate black is defined as being BB, a dog who is black spotted but carries liver is Bb and a liver dog is bb. Black spotted dogs always have black noses, and liver spotted dogs always have brown noses.

Other colors that occur occasionally include blue (a blue-grayish color), brindle, mosaic, orange or lemon (dark to pale yellow), or tricolored (with black, brown and orange or lemon spots). Orange and lemon occur the most frequently, especially in America, and are dilutes of the standard colours. They are defined as orange or lemon depending on their nose colour.

Another coloration pattern is a larger solid patch of color, which appears anywhere on the body, but most often on the head, ears, or tail. Patches are visible at birth and are not a group of connected spots; they are identifiable by the smooth edge of the patch, and that they have no interlacing white hairs in them. Pure white individuals without spots also occur occasionally.

The Dalmatian coat is usually short, fine, and dense; however, smooth-coated Dalmatians occasionally produce long-coated offspring. Long-coated Dalmatians are not acceptable in the breed standard, but these individuals experience much less shedding than their smooth-coated counterparts, which shed considerably year-round. The standard variety's short, stiff hairs often weave into carpet, clothing, upholstery, and nearly any other kind of fabric and can be difficult to remove. Weekly grooming with a hound mitt or currycomb can lessen the amount of hair Dalmatians shed, although nothing can completely prevent shedding. Due to the minimal amount of oil in their coats, Dalmatians lack a dog odor and stay fairly clean relative to many other dog breeds.

Low uric acid (LUA) Dalmatians typically have smaller spots, which do not have as strong a pigment as standard Dalmatians. LUA breeders are trying to deal with this aspect, but it still remains possible to be able to pick a LUA out in a line up.

Litter size 
Dalmatians usually have litters of six to nine pups.

Health 

Like other breeds, Dalmatians display a propensity towards certain health problems specific to their breed, such as deafness, allergies, and urinary stones. Reputable breeders have their puppies' BAER (brainstem auditory evoked response) tested to ensure the status of the hearing on their pups. The Dalmatian Club of America lists the average lifespan of a Dalmatian at between 11 and 13 years, although some can live as long as 15 to 16 years. Breed health surveys in the US and the UK show an average lifespan of 9.9 and 11.55 years, respectively. In their late teens, both males and females may suffer bone spurs and arthritic conditions. Autoimmune thyroiditis may be a relatively common condition for the breed, affecting 11.6% of dogs.

Deafness 
A genetic predisposition for deafness is a serious health problem for Dalmatians; American Dalmatians exhibit a prevalence for bilateral congenital sensoneural deafness of 8% (for which there is no possible treatment), compared with 5.3% for the UK population. Deafness was not recognized by early breeders, so the breed was thought to be unintelligent. Many breeders, when hearing testing started to become the norm, were amazed to discover that they had unilateral hearing dogs. Even after recognizing the problem as a genetic fault, breeders did not understand the dogs' nature, and deafness in Dalmatians continues to be a frequent problem.

Researchers now know deafness in albino and piebald animals is caused by the absence of mature melanocytes in the inner ear. This may affect one or both ears. The condition is also common in other canine breeds that share a genetic propensity for light pigmentation. This includes, but is not limited to Bull Terriers, Dogo Argentinos, Poodles, Boxers, Border Collies and Great Danes.

Typically, only dogs with bilateral hearing are bred, although those with unilateral hearing, and even dogs with bilateral deafness, make fine pets with appropriate training. The main, and most noticeable, difference in a dog with uni hearing is that they do not have directional hearing; though the dog will be able to hear someone, they will not be able to hear the direction they are in. The Dalmatian Club of America's position on deaf pups is that they should not be used for breeding, and that humane euthanasia may be considered as an "alternative to placement". The British Dalmatian Club recommends only purchasing pups who are BAER-tested, and requests all members to provide BAER testing results of their puppies so that the true deafness statistics can be looked at.

It has been proved that it is the inheritance of the extreme piebald gene that causes blue eyes. It is therefore frowned upon to breed from blue-eyed Dalmatians even if they are fully hearing. Blue-eyed Dalmatians are not typically shown in the UK.

Hip dysplasia 
Even though there is no evidence nor statistically relevant data to suggest that hip dysplasia is another disease that affects Dalmatians, some blogs say that it affects nearly 5% of purebred Dalmatians, causing those to experience limping, fatigue, moderate to severe pain, and trouble standing up. Even though this data is not available, it is believed that Dalmatians who eventually develop hip dysplasia are born with normal hips, but the soft tissues surrounding the joint grow abnormally due to their genetic makeup. The disease may affect both hips or the right or left hip, leading afflicted dogs to walk or run with an altered gait. The most cited scientific report about canine hip dysplasia omits Dalmatians among the breeds usually affected by that disease.

Hyperuricemia 

Dalmatians, like humans, can suffer from hyperuricemia. Dalmatians' livers have trouble breaking down uric acid, which can build up in the blood serum (hyperuricemia) causing gout. Uric acid can also be excreted in high concentration into the urine, causing kidney stones and bladder stones. These conditions are most likely to occur in middle-aged males. Males over ten are prone to kidney stones and should have their calcium intake reduced or be given preventive medication. To reduce the risk of gout and stones, owners should carefully limit the intake of purines by avoiding giving their dogs food containing organ meats, animal byproducts, or other high-purine ingredients. Hyperuricemia in Dalmatians responds to treatment with orgotein, the veterinary formulation of the antioxidant enzyme superoxide dismutase.

Dalmatian-Pointer Backcross Project 
Hyperuricemia in Dalmatians (as in all breeds) is inherited, but unlike other breeds, the normal gene for a uric acid transporter that allows for uric acid to enter liver cells and be subsequently broken down is not present in the breed's gene pool. Therefore, there is no possibility of eliminating hyperuricemia among pure-bred Dalmatians. The only possible solution to this problem must then be crossing Dalmatians with other breeds to reintroduce the normal uric acid transporter gene. This led to the foundation of the Dalmatian-Pointer Backcross Project, which aims to reintroduce the normal uric acid transporter gene into the Dalmatian breed. The backcross used a single English Pointer; subsequent breedings have all been to purebred Dalmatians. This project was started in 1973 by Dr. Robert Schaible. The first cross (F1) hybrids did not resemble Dalmatians very closely. The F1s were then crossed back to purebreds. This breeding produced puppies of closer resemblance to the pure Dalmatian. By the fifth generation in 1981, they resembled purebreds so much, Dr. Schaible convinced the AKC to allow two of the hybrids to be registered as purebreds. Then AKC President William F. Stifel stated, "If there is a logical, scientific way to correct genetic health problems associated with certain breed traits and still preserve the integrity of the breed standard, it is incumbent upon the American Kennel Club to lead the way." The Dalmatian Club of America's (DCA) board of directors supported this decision; however, it quickly became highly controversial among the club members. A vote by DCA members opposed the registration of the hybrids, causing the AKC to ban registration to any of the dog's offspring.

At the annual general meeting of the DCA in May 2006, the backcross issue was discussed again by club members. In June of the same year, DCA members were presented with an opportunity to vote on whether to reopen the discussion of the Dalmatian Backcross Project. The results of this ballot were nearly 2:1 in favor of re-examining support of the project by the DCA. This has begun with the publication of articles presenting more information both in support of and questioning the need for this project. In July 2011, the AKC agreed to allow registration of backcrossed Dalmatians.

In 2010, the UK Kennel Club registered a backcrossed Dalmatian called Ch. Fiacre's First and Foremost. Several restrictions were imposed on the dog. Although the dog is at least 13 generations removed from the original Pointer cross, its F1 to F3 progeny will be marked on registration certificates with asterisks (which "indicate impure or unverified breeding",) no progeny will be eligible to be exported as pedigrees for the next five years, and all have to be health tested. UK Dalmatian breed clubs have objected to the decision by the Kennel Club.

The Dalmatian Heritage Project 
The Dalmatian Heritage Project began in 2005.  The goal of the project is to preserve and improve the Dalmatian breed by breeding parent dogs with the following traits:

 Normal urinary metabolism
 Bilateral hearing
 Friendly and confident

All puppies in the Heritage Project are descendants of Dr. Robert Schaible's parent line.  Today, "Dr. Schaible's line produces the only Dalmatians in the world today that are free of a metabolic defect that can lead to urinary tract problems."

History 

The FCI recognized Croatia as its country of origin, citing several historical sources.

The first known written information about Dalmatian dog is from 1375, when Bishop of Đakovo, Peter mentions hunting dog from Croatia, mostly from Dalmatia with short white hair and black round spots on various parts of the body, and he called him .
The first illustrations of the dog have been found in Croatia: an altar painting in Veli Lošinj dating to 1600–1630, and a fresco in Zaostrog. In 1771, Thomas Pennant described the breed in his book Synopsis of Quadrupeds, writing that the origin of the breed is from Dalmatia; he referred to it as Dalmatian. The book by Thomas Bewick, A General History of Quadrupeds, published in 1790 refers to the breed as Dalmatian or Coach Dog.

During the Regency period, the Dalmatian became a status symbol trotting alongside the horse-drawn carriages and those with decorative spotting were highly prized. For this reason, the breed earned the epithet 'the Spotted Coach Dog.' The breed was also used to guard the stables at night.

The breed had been developed and cultivated chiefly in England. The first unofficial standard for the breed was introduced by Englishman Vero Shaw in 1882. In 1890 with the formation of the first Dalmatian Club in England, the standard became official. When the dog with the distinctive markings was first shown in England in 1862, it was said to have been used as a guard dog and companion to the nomads of Dalmatia. The breed's unique coat became popular and widely distributed over the continent of Europe beginning in 1920. Its unusual markings were often mentioned by the old writers on cynology.

Duties 

The roles of this breed are as varied as their reputed ancestors. They were used as hunting dogs, dogs of war, guarding the borders of Dalmatia. To this day, the breed retains a high guarding instinct; although friendly and loyal to those the dog knows and trusts, it is often aloof with strangers and unknown dogs. Dalmatians have a strong hunting instinct and are an excellent exterminator of rats and vermin. In sporting, they have been used as bird dogs, trail hounds, retrievers, or in packs for wild boar or stag hunting. Their dramatic markings and intelligence have made them successful circus dogs throughout the years.

Dalmatians are perhaps best known for working for firefighters for their role as firefighting apparatus escorts and firehouse mascots. Since Dalmatians and horses are very compatible, the dogs were easily trained to run in front of the carriages to help clear a path and quickly guide the horses and firefighters to the fires.

Dalmatians are often considered to make good watchdogs, and they may have been useful to fire brigades as guard dogs to protect a firehouse and its equipment. Fire engines used to be drawn by fast and powerful horses, a tempting target for thieves, so Dalmatians were kept in the firehouse as deterrence to theft.

In popular culture

Firefighting 
Dalmatians are associated with firefighting, particularly in the United States. In the days of horse-drawn fire engines, dogs would guard the horses, who could easily become uncomfortable at the scene of a fire. Dalmatians were a popular breed for this job, due to their natural affinity to horses and history of being used as carriage dogs. This role became unnecessary once horse-drawn fire engines were replaced with steam- and diesel-powered ones. Due to its history, the Dalmatian often serves as a mascot for the fire service, and is still chosen by many firefighters as a pet. The Dalmatian is also the mascot of the Pi Kappa Alpha International Fraternity, which has been associated with firefighting.

Anheuser-Busch 

The Dalmatian is also associated, particularly in the United States, with Budweiser beer and the Busch Gardens theme parks, since the Anheuser-Busch company's iconic beer wagon, drawn by a team of Clydesdale horses, is always accompanied by a Dalmatian.
The company maintains several teams at various locations, which tour extensively. Dalmatians were historically used by brewers to guard the wagon while the driver was making deliveries.

101 Dalmatians 
The Dalmatian breed experienced a massive surge in popularity as a result of the 1956 novel The Hundred and One Dalmatians written by British author Dodie Smith, and later due to the two Walt Disney films based on the book. The Disney animated film, released in 1961, later spawned a 1996 live-action remake, 101 Dalmatians. In the years following the release of the sequel 102 Dalmatians in 2000, the breed suffered greatly at the hands of irresponsible breeders and inexperienced owners. Many well-meaning enthusiasts purchased Dalmatians—often for their children—without educating themselves on the breed and the responsibilities that come with owning such a high-energy dog breed. Dalmatians were abandoned in large numbers by their original owners and left with animal shelters. As a result, Dalmatian rescue organizations sprang up to care for the unwanted dogs and find them new homes. AKC registrations of Dalmatians decreased 90% during the 2000–2010 period.

Lou Dog

One famous Dalmatian in popular culture is Louie or "Lou Dog", the mascot of rock band Sublime. Adopted by singer Bradley Nowell in 1990 as a puppy, Lou Dog would become a central part of Sublime's image, often wandering the stage while the band was playing as well as appearing in the band's music videos. In addition, Nowell would frequently reference Louie in song lyrics, one example being in the band's most popular song “What I Got” ("...livin' with Louie Dog's the only way to stay sane".)

After Nowell's death, Lou Dog was cared for by the band's manager until his death in 2001.

Monster Jam

The Monster Mutt Dalmatian monster truck was debuted in 2007 as a spin-off to Monster Mutt, with Candice Jolly and Cynthia Gauthier driving the said truck. The latter truck actually debuted in 2003.

See also
 Dogs portal
 List of dog breeds
 Companion dog

References

External links 

 
 Deafness in Dogs: LSU & Dr. Strain
 
 Dalmatian-Pointer Backcross information translated to multiple languages
 About of Lemon Dalmatians

Dalmatia
FCI breeds
Dog breeds originating in Croatia
Companion dogs